Riticia Nabbosa (born 9 October 1997) is a Ugandan footballer who plays as a midfielder for FUFA Women Super League club Lady Doves FC and the Uganda women's national team.

Club career 
Nabbosa has played for Lady Doves in Uganda.

International career 
Nabbosa capped for Uganda at senior level during the 2021 COSAFA Women's Championship.

International goals
Scores and results list Uganda goal tally first

References

External links 
 

1997 births
Living people
Ugandan women's footballers
Women's association football midfielders
Uganda women's international footballers